Maha-Shivagupta Balarjuna alias Shivagupta was the greatest and most powerful king of the Panduvamshi dynasty of Dakshina Kosala. Under him, Sirpur witnessed incredible growth in cultural and political activities.

Name
His own copper-plate inscriptions call him Maha-Shivagupta, and the seals of these inscriptions call him Shivagupta; the other inscriptions issued during his reign generally call him either Shivagupta or Balarjuna, except one inscription that calls him Maha-Shivagupta. Balarjuna was probably his personal name, and Mahashivagupta was probably his coronation name.

Personal life
Maha-Shivagupta Balarjuna was the son of Harshagupta and his queen Vasata. He succeeded his father after his death in 595 CE. He had a younger brother named Ranakesarin and a son named Shivanandin.

Reign
His younger brother Ranakesarin supported him in his military conquests. Under his reign, Sirpur, the capital of the Panduvamshis, witnessed its golden age. The town witnessed incredible growth in cultural and political activities. Different religions were given royal patronage and various temples and monasteries were built.  The Buddhist monastery at Sirpur, which is very important, was built by him. An inscription dated to his 57th regnal year has been discovered, indicating that he ruled for at least 57 years. He enjoyed a peaceful and prosperous reign, and the panduvamshis probably reached their zenith under him.  Different religions were given royal patronage and various temples and monasteries were built. The famous temple of Surang Tila was built by him.

Xuanzang's visit
Xuanzang, the Chinese monk, traveller, and pilgrim, would have probably visited Dakshina Kosala during the reign of Mahashivagupta Balarjuna.

He mentions Kosala, Kiao-sa-lo, a country about 5000 li in circuit. Without mentioning the name of the capital town, he tells it was 40 li in circuit. He describes its very dense population, men were tall, black complexioned, brave and impetuous. He found both heretics and believers here. The king, whose name he did not supply, was of kshatriya race but also honors the law of Buddha and his virtue and love were far renowned. There were about one hundred sangharamas housing less than 10000 priests, all belonging to Mahayana. There were also about seventy Deva temples. He also mentions a stupa built by the Maurya king Ashoka, where Buddha also showed his miracles. In the monastery attached to stupa was lived Nagarjuna bodhisattva.

Here is what Xuanzang describes Dakshina Kosala:

Religion
Balarjuna was a Shaivite, and his seal featured Shiva's bull nandin. He granted a village to a Buddhist monastery at the request of his maternal uncle Bhaskaravarman (a brother of Vasata).

Aftermath
Soon after Mahashivagupta Balarjuna, Sirpur lost its importance on the political stage however cultural importance continued. The dynasty also suffered some loses at the hands of the Nalas. The Panduvamshis of Dakshina Kosala started to decline after his death, and there is no record of Panduvamshi kings after Maha-Shivagupta.

References

Bibliography
 

Mahasamund district
Kshatriya
Buddhist temples in India